Ngọc Thiện is a commune (xã) and village in Tân Yên District, Bắc Giang Province, in northeastern Vietnam. it is contiguous with the smaller location of Ải Thôn to the northeast.

References

Populated places in Bắc Giang province
Communes of Bắc Giang province